Joemar Del Carmen Guarecuco Barroso (born 20 June 1994) is a Venezuelan women's footballer who has played for the national team. She currently plays for Campeonato Brasileiro de Futebol Feminino Série A1 side Ferroviária.

Club career
From 2011 until 2012, she played for Yaracuyanos F.C. Femino, and from 2013–2016, she played for Estudiantes de Guárico. Whilst at Estudiantes de Guárico, she won the Venezuelan women's football championship in 2013, 2015, and 2016, and was part of the team that came second in the 2016 Copa Libertadores Femenina. In 2017, she played for Zamora FC, She played for Estudiantes de Guárico in the 2016 Copa Libertadores Femenina, and scored a goal in their semi-final match against Colón. In 2018, she signed for Colombian side Cortuluá Femenino. 

In 2020, Guarecuco signed for Colombian side América de Cali. She was the joint third top scorer in the 2020 Colombian Women's Football League, with four goals. She played for América de Cali in the 2020 Copa Libertadores Femenina, where they lost in the final to Brazilian team Ferroviária. She scored six goals in the 2021 Colombian Women's Football League, and was the joint second top-scorer. In September 2021, she was loaned to Colombian club Santa Fe for the 2021 Copa Libertadores Femenina; she was the club's third Venezuelan player. In January 2022, she signed for Campeonato Brasileiro de Futebol Feminino Série A1 side Ferroviária.

International career
In 2009, Guarecuco scored the crucial goal for Venezuela U-17 against Paraguay U-17, causing them to qualifying for the 2010 FIFA U-17 Women's World Cup in Trinidad and Tobago. She played in three matches in the tournament. Later, Guarecuco scored a hat-trick in Venezuela under-17's 4–1 victory over Trinidad and Tobago under-17s. Guarecuco was in the senior squad for the 2018 Copa América Femenina in Chile. She made one substitute appearance. Guarecuco was not selected for the Venezuelan squad for 2022 Copa América Femenina due to a cruciate ligament injury.

References

External links
 Soccerway

Venezuelan women's footballers
Venezuela women's international footballers
1994 births
Cortuluá footballers
Zamora CF footballers
Atlético Madrid Femenino players
Living people
Women's association football forwards
Venezuelan expatriate women's footballers
People from Barinas (state)
Associação Ferroviária de Esportes (women) players
América de Cali (women) players
Independiente Santa Fe (women) players
Expatriate women's footballers in Spain
Expatriate women's footballers in Colombia
Expatriate women's footballers in Brazil
Venezuelan expatriate sportspeople in Spain
Venezuelan expatriate sportspeople in Colombia
Venezuelan expatriate sportspeople in Brazil